USS Sovereign may refer to more than one United States Navy ship:
 , a steamer in commission from 1862 to 1865
 , a patrol vessel in commission from 1918 to 1919

United States Navy ship names